Aubrey Lackington Moore (1848–1890) was an English Anglo-Catholic priest and one of the first Christian Darwinians. He has been described as "the clergyman who more than any other man was responsible for breaking down the antagonisms towards Evolution then widely felt in the English Church".

Life
Moore was born on 30 March 1848 in Camberwell, England, the second son of Daniel Moore, vicar of Holy Trinity, Paddington, and prebendary of St Paul's.

He was educated at St Paul's School from 1860 to 1867, which he left with an exhibition, matriculating as a commoner of Exeter College, Oxford, 1867, whence, after obtaining first-class honours in classical moderations and literae humaniores, he graduated B.A. in 1871 (M.A. 1874).

He was fellow of St John's College, Oxford, 1872–1876; became a lecturer and tutor (1874); was assistant tutor at Magdalen College (1875); and was rector of Frenchay, near Bristol, from 1876 to 1881, when he was appointed a tutor of Keble College.

He became examining chaplain to Bishops John Mackarness and William Stubbs of Oxford, select preacher at Oxford 1885–1886, Whitehall preacher 1887–1888, and hon. canon of Christ Church 1887. A few weeks before his death, he accepted an official fellowship as dean of divinity at Magdalen College, Oxford, and when nominated simultaneously to examine in the final honour schools of theology and literae humaniores, accepted the latter post.

He died after a very brief illness on 17 January 1890 and was buried in Holywell Cemetery.

At Oxford, Moore had a unique position as at once a theologian and a philosopher of recognised attainments in natural science, dealing fearlessly with the metaphysical and scientific questions affecting theology. He lectured mainly on philosophy and on the history of the Reformation. Though rendered constitutionally weak by physical deformity, he had great powers of endurance and hard work, was a brilliant talker and preacher, and distinguished as a botanist.

Family
He married in 1876 Catherine, daughter of Frank Hurt, by whom he left three daughters. A fund of nearly £1,000 was subscribed to his memory by friends, from which an 'Aubrey Moore' studentship (for theological research), open to graduates of Oxford, was founded in 1890.

Theology
Moore argued that Darwinism was not in conflict with Christianity.  He differed from other religious figures of the time by accepting the theory of natural selection, incorporating it into his Christian beliefs as merely the way God worked. He wrote that evolution

Moore was curator of the Botanical Gardens in England in 1887.  He wrote two books: Science and Faith (1889) and Essays Scientific and Philosophical (1890), and was a contributor to Lux Mundi (1889).

H. O. Wakeman's History of the Church of England (1897) is dedicated to Moore.

Selected works
 Essays Scientific and Philosophical (1890)
 Evolution and Christianity (1889)
 Lectures and Papers on the History of the Reformation in England and on the Continent (1890)
 Note on the Philosophy of Chuang Tzŭ
 Science and Faith (1893)
 Theology and Law (1884)

References

Citations

Works cited

  This article incorporates text from this public-domain publication.

Further reading

 

1848 births
1890 deaths
19th-century English Anglican priests
19th-century English Christian theologians
19th-century English philosophers
19th-century Protestant theologians
Academics of the University of Oxford
Alumni of Exeter College, Oxford
Anglican philosophers
Anglo-Catholic clergy
Anglo-Catholic theologians
English Anglican theologians
English Anglo-Catholics
English curators
Fellows of St John's College, Oxford
People educated at St Paul's School, London
19th-century British philosophers